Krul is the surname of: 

 Huiberdina Krul (1922-1994), Dutch Olympic artistic gymnast
 J. T. Krul (born 1972), American comic book writer, best known for his work on Aspen MLT's Fathom comic series
 Jan Harmenszoon Krul (1601–1646), Dutch Catholic playwright
 Tim Krul, (born 1988), Dutch footballer
 André Krul, (born 1987), Dutch footballer

Other uses
 Flourish of approval, a symbol used for correcting work. Also known as the krul.

See also
 Krol
 Krull (disambiguation)